Naked Singularity is a 2021 American black comedy crime thriller film, directed by Chase Palmer in his directorial debut, from a screenplay by Palmer and David Matthews. It is based upon the 2008 novel of the same name by Sergio De La Pava. It stars John Boyega, Olivia Cooke, Bill Skarsgård, Ed Skrein, Linda Lavin, and Tim Blake Nelson.

It had its world premiere at the San Francisco International Film Festival on April 9, 2021, and was released in a limited release on August 6, 2021, prior to VOD on August 13, 2021, by Screen Media Films.

Synopsis
"An idealistic young New York City public defender burned out by the system, on the brink of disbarment, and seeing signs of the universe collapsing all around him decides to rob a multi-million drug deal of one of his clients."

Cast

Production
In December 2018, it was announced John Boyega had joined the cast of the film, with Chase Palmer directing from a screenplay he wrote alongside David Matthews. Ridley Scott will serve as an executive producer under his Scott Free Productions banner. Dick Wolf will also serve as an executive producer. In April 2019, Olivia Cooke joined the cast of the film. In May 2019, Ed Skrein and Bill Skarsgård joined the cast of the film.

Principal photography began in New York City in May 2019.

Release
It had its world premiere at the San Francisco International Film Festival on April 9, 2021. In June 2021, Screen Media Films acquired distribution rights to the film. It was released in a limited release on August 6, 2021, prior to video on demand on August 13, 2021.

Reception 
On Rotten Tomatoes, the film holds an approval rating of 26% based on 38 reviews, and an average rating of 4.70/10. The critics' consensus reads: "Naked Singularity has wild ambition and a talented lead on its side, but neither ingredient is enough to offset the film's clumsy jumble of tones and ideas". On Metacritic, the film has a weighted average score of 36 out of 100 based on 12 critics, indicating "generally unfavorable reviews".

References

External links
 
 

2021 films
American drama films
Films about the illegal drug trade
Films about lawyers
Films based on American novels
Films set in New York City
Films shot in New York City
Scott Free Productions films
2021 directorial debut films
Films about Mexican drug cartels
2020s English-language films
2020s American films